"Long Shot" is a song written by Gary Scruggs and Don Schlitz, and recorded by American country music group Baillie & the Boys.  It was released in October 1988 as the first single from the album Turn the Tide.  The song reached #5 on the Billboard Hot Country Singles & Tracks chart.

Chart performance

References

1988 singles
Baillie & the Boys songs
Songs written by Don Schlitz
Song recordings produced by Kyle Lehning
RCA Records singles
1988 songs